Valea Gruiului River may refer to:

 Valea Gruiului, a tributary of the Dâmbovița in Argeș County, Romania
 Valea Gruiului, a tributary of the Valea Bădenilor in Argeș County, Romania